Overview may refer to:

 Overview article, an artícle that summarizes the current state of understanding on a topic
 Overview map, generalised view of a geographic area

See also 
 Summary (disambiguation)
 Outline (list)
 A Brief Overview
 Overview and Scrutiny
 Overview effect